Get Low Recordz was a San Francisco based independent record label founded in 1991 and owned by rapper/producer JT the Bigga Figga. The first artists who released material on Get Low Recordz were JT the Bigga Figga, Get Low Playaz, San Quinn, The Game and D-Moe. In 1995, the label got a distribution deal with Priority Records for a few years. The label became involved in a beef with Memphis Bleek's record label of the same name. The label had since been dissolved.

Artists
 Tha Gamblaz
 JT the Bigga Figga
 San Quinn
 D-Moe
 J La Rue
 Messy Marv
 Seff Tha Gaffla

See also
 List of record labels

External links
 Discography at Discogs

Record labels established in 1992
American independent record labels
Hip hop record labels
Companies based in San Francisco
Gangsta rap record labels